Homedale is a city in Owyhee County Idaho. The population was 2,633 at the time of the 2010 census. The town name was chosen by drawing names from a hat during a community picnic. Homedale is part of the Boise metropolitan area. It was, at one time, the terminus of a branch of the Oregon Short Line Railroad.

History
Homedale was first settled by Jacob Mussell in the late 19th century. In 1898 Jacob Mussell built a ferry boat to help settlers cross the Snake River making Homedale more accessible. By 1914 Homedale had a mayor, a council, a schoolhouse, and a railroad though it wouldn't be an official city until 1920. In 1914 Austrians were lured to Homedale and promised good farming ground. When they arrived in Homedale they found the land undeveloped though they still had to buy the land. Today there still is an Austrian Town in Homedale. Basque culture is also deeply rooted in Homedale.

Geography
The city is on the Snake River, which is the border with Canyon County.

Demographics

2010 census
As of the census of 2010, there were 2,633 people, 877 households, and 609 families living in the city. The racial makeup of the city was 63.1% White, 0.2% African American, 1.3% Native American, 1.0% Asian, 31.3% from other races, and 3.2% from two or more races. Hispanic or Latino of any race were 43.0% of the population.

There were 877 households, of which 43.9% had children under the age of 18 living with them, 48.2% were married couples living together, 14.3% had a female householder with no husband present, 7.0% had a male householder with no wife present, and 30.6% were non-families. 25.2% of all households were made up of individuals, and 12.9% had someone living alone who was 65 years of age or older. The average household size was 2.96 and the average family size was 3.58.

The median age in the city was 31.9 years. 33.5% of residents were under the age of 18; 8.7% were between the ages of 18 and 24; 25.2% were from 25 to 44; 19% were from 45 to 64; and 13.5% were 65 years of age or older. The gender makeup of the city was 49.9% male and 50.1% female.

2000 census
As of the census of 2000, there were 2,528 people, 842 households, and 595 families living in the city. The racial makeup of the city was 63.77% White, 0.20% African American, 0.99% Native American, 0.71% Asian, 0.08% Pacific Islander, 30.58% from other races, and 3.68% from two or more races. Hispanic or Latino of any race were 39.24% of the population.

There were 842 households, out of which 42.3% had children under the age of 18 living with them, 54.3% were married couples living together, 12.4% had a female householder with no husband present, and 29.3% were non-families. 26.6% of all households were made up of individuals, and 14.7% had someone living alone who was 65 years of age or older. The average household size was 2.95 and the average family size was 3.66.

In the city, the population was spread out, with 36.0% under the age of 18, 8.8% from 18 to 24, 25.0% from 25 to 44, 16.2% from 45 to 64, and 14.0% who were 65 years of age or older. The median age was 29 years. For every 100 females, there were 96.7 males. For every 100 females age 18 and over, there were 92.7 males.

The median income for a household in the city was $24,196, and the median income for a family was $27,500. Males had a median income of $22,740 versus $19,722 for females. The per capita income for the city was $10,986. About 17.8% of families and 20.3% of the population were below the poverty line, including 24.9% of those under age 18 and 13.1% of those age 65 or over.

Highways
The city is served by U.S. Route 95, the primary north–south highway for the state. State Highway 19 heads westward for five miles (8 km) and enters Oregon to become Oregon Route 201, which turns northward to Ontario.

Climate
According to the Köppen climate classification, Homedale has a cold semi arid climate (BSk).

Education 
 Homedale Elementary School, grades K–4.
 Homedale Middle School, grades 5–8.
 Homedale High School, grades 9–12.

Newspaper 
 The Owyhee Avalanche

Annual events
 Txoko Ona Basque dance
 July 4 Demolition Derby
 Owyhee County Fair and Rodeo (first full week in August)
 Conner Landa Memorial Softball Tournament (July)

Notable people 
 Niles Fulwyler, United States Army major general
 Ralph D. Townsend, military officer
 Ted Trueblood, outdoor writer and conservationist
 Fred Wood, member of the Idaho House of Representatives

See also

 List of cities in Idaho

References

External links

Cities in Idaho
Cities in Owyhee County, Idaho
Boise metropolitan area